Tarkhanov is a Russian masculine surname, its feminine counterpart is Tarkhanova. It may refer to:

 Aleksandr Tarkhanov (born 1954), Russian football coach and former player 
 Ivan Tarkhanov (painter) (1780–1848), Russian painter
 Ivan Tarkhanov (physiologist) (1846–1908), Georgian physiologist
 Mikhail Tarkhanov (actor) (1877–1948), Russian and Soviet stage actor and theatre director
 Mikhail Tarkhanov (painter) (1888–1962), Russian and Soviet painter

Russian-language surnames